Generations is a studio album by American jazz vibraphonist Gary Burton. The album was released on  via Concord Jazz label. It features Burton with a younger band of guitarist Julian Lage, pianist Makoto Ozone, bassist James Genus and drummer Clarence Penn.

Reception
Dave Gelly of The Guardian stated, "A former youthful prodigy himself, Burton has been responsible for discovering and nurturing young talent throughout his long career, and he's done it again. Guitarist Julian Lage was 16 when this was recorded last September. He plays with astonishing maturity, knitting his lines into the group fabric with assurance and producing beautifully rounded solos. The title is apt, since the three main soloists represent different generations - Burton is 61 and pianist Makoto Ozone, an earlier Burton discovery, 43. It is good to hear Burton's vibraphone as part of a full quintet again, superb though his recent series of duet recordings have been. The most unselfish of leaders, he has the rare knack of making others play their best. Bassist James Genus and drummer Clarence Penn complete an ensemble that feels like a band, not just a collection of soloists."

Jerry Karp of SF Gate wrote, "Generations was recorded in September of last year with Ozone's regular rhythm section, bassist James Genus and drummer Clarence Penn. It's a rewarding collection in which Lage is revealed as a lithe, assured soloist and a talented composer. With the success of the "Generations" CD, Burton decided to put together a touring band, a decision facilitated by his retirement from Berklee School of Music in Boston after 33 years as a teacher and administrator, the last eight as executive vice president. The demands of that position had forced Burton to limit his live appearances primarily to duet performances with Ozone and another longtime collaborator, pianist Chick Corea. Before getting this ensemble on the road, Burton had gone a full seven years without a working band, a long time for a renowned group leader."

Track listing

Personnel
Gary Burton – producer, vibraphone
James Genus – bass
Julian Lage – guitar
Makoto Ozone – piano
Clarence Penn – drums

References

External links

Gary Burton albums
2004 albums